The Sabinas River is a river in Mexico. It is a tributary of the Rio Salado, which in turn flows into the Rio Grande.

See also
 List of rivers of Mexico
 List of tributaries of the Rio Grande

References

Atlas of Mexico, 1975 (http://www.lib.utexas.edu/maps/atlas_mexico/river_basins.jpg).
The Prentice Hall American World Atlas, 1984.
Rand McNally, The New International Atlas, 1993.

Tributaries of the Rio Grande
Rivers of Mexico
Ramsar sites in Mexico